Sycamore Run (formerly Squaw Run) is a tributary of the Allegheny River located in Allegheny County in the U.S. state of Pennsylvania. Due to the offensive nature of the word "squaw," the name was changed to Sycamore Run on September 8, 2022.

Course

Sycamore Run joins the Allegheny River at the township of O'Hara.

Tributaries

(Mouth at the Allegheny River)

Stony Camp Run
Glade Run

See also

 List of rivers of Pennsylvania
 List of tributaries of the Allegheny River

References

External links

U.S. Geological Survey: PA stream gaging stations

Rivers of Pennsylvania
Tributaries of the Allegheny River
Rivers of Allegheny County, Pennsylvania